Kurusu (written: 来栖) is a Japanese surname. Notable people with the surname include:

, Japanese actress
, Imperial Japanese Army officer
, Japanese diplomat
, Japanese politician

Fictional characters
, the protagonist in the manga adaption of Persona 5
, a character in the light novel series Oreimo

Japanese-language surnames